Ilona Vladimirovna Markova (born 18 January 2002) is a Russian ice hockey player and member of the Russian national ice hockey team, currently playing in the Zhenskaya Hockey League (ZhHL) with Agidel Ufa.

Playing career

Markova represented the Russian Olympic Committee (ROC) at the 2021 IIHF Women's World Championship and was selected by the coaches as one of Russia’s top three players. She was named to the ROC roster for the women's ice hockey tournament at the 2022 Winter Olympics but was unable to participate after receiving a positive COVID-19 test result shortly before the team departed for Beijing.

As a junior player with the Russian national under-18 team, she participated in the IIHF Women's U18 World Championships in 2018, 2019, and 2020. At the 2018 and 2019 tournaments, she was selected by the coaches as one of Russia’s top three players and also named to the tournament All-Star Teams. At the 2020 tournament, she captained Russia to a bronze medal finish. 

Markova made her senior club debut with SKIF Nizhny Novgorod in the 2017–18 ZhHL season and has played with Agidel Ufa since the 2018–19 season. She was selected to the 2022 ZhHL All-Star Game.

References

External links
 

Living people
2002 births
Sportspeople from Kirov, Kirov Oblast
Russian women's ice hockey forwards
HC Agidel Ufa players
HC SKIF players